Beacon Health Options, Inc. is a behavioral health company based in Boston, Massachusetts. On Jun. 6, 2019, Anthem, Inc. (now Elevance Health) announced that it had entered into a definitive agreement to acquire Beacon Health Options. The acquisition was completed on Mar. 2, 2020. Prior to the acquisition, Beacon Health was the largest privately held company of its kind in the United States. The company is the product of a 2014 merger between Beacon Health Strategies, LLC and ValueOptions, Inc. 

The company currently employs 4,700 people nationwide, serving over 40 million people.

Description
Beacon Health Options is a subsidiary of FHC Health Systems, Inc. The company provides behavioral healthcare management to 41 Fortune 500 companies, national and regional health plans, and federal, state, and local governments. Overall, the company serves over 45 million people in the United States. Most Beacon Health Options locations are accredited by URAC (formerly the Utilization Review Accreditation Commission). Many Beacon locations also hold National Committee for Quality Assurance (NCQA) accreditation. Prior to joining with Beacon Health Strategies, ValueOptions was the product of a 1998 merger of two smaller companies, Value Behavioral Health and Options Health Care. Today, Beacon Health Options is led by Glenn MacFarlane, Chief Executive Officer.

References

External links
 Company website

Companies based in Boston
Medical and health organizations based in Massachusetts
Insurance companies of the United States